The Minister of Agriculture and Land Affairs was, from 1996 to 2009, a Minister of the Cabinet of South Africa, with responsibility for the Departments of Agriculture and Land Affairs. The portfolio was created in 1996 when the positions of Minister of Agriculture and Minister of Land Affairs were merged. In the 2009 cabinet reorganization after the election of President Jacob Zuma, the portfolio's responsibilities were divided and transferred to the Minister of Agriculture, Forestry and Fisheries and the Minister of Rural Development and Land Reform.

Ministers of Agriculture and Land Affairs

See also
 Department of Agriculture (South Africa)
 Department of Land Affairs (South Africa)

External links
 Ministry of Agriculture, Forestry and Fisheries
 Ministry of Rural Development and Land Reform
 Department of Agriculture, Forestry and Fisheries
 Department of Rural Development and Land Reform

Agriculture and Land Affairs
 
South Africa
South Africa